Ferrat is a surname. Notable people with the surname include:

Hippolyte Ferrat (1822–1882), French artist
Jean Ferrat (1930–2010), French singer-songwriter and poet
Alain Ferrat (born 1973), Mexican politician
Sebastián Ferrat (birth name  Roberto González López; 1978–2019), Mexican actor